Defending champions Martina Navratilova and Pam Shriver defeated Claudia Kohde-Kilsch and Helena Suková in the final, 6–1, 6–1 to win the doubles tennis title at the 1987 Virginia Slims Championships. It was Navratilova's tenth Tour Finals doubles title, and Shriver's seventh.

Seeds

Draw

Draw

References
 Official Results Archive (ITF)
 Official Results Archive (WTA)

Doubles
Doubles